Albert Castelyns, also known as Albert Casteleyns (born 2 May 1917) was a Belgian water polo player who competed in the late 1930s. In the 1950s, he competed in bobsleigh.

Water polo career
At the 1936 Summer Olympics in Berlin he was part of the Belgian water polo team that won the bronze medal. Casteleyns played five matches.

Bobsleigh career
In the 1950s Casteleyns competed in bobsleigh. Taking part in two Winter Olympics, he earned his best finish of sixth in the two-man event at Oslo in 1952.

See also
 List of Olympic medalists in water polo (men)

References
 1952 bobsleigh two-man results
 1956 bobsleigh two-man results

External links
 

1917 births
Belgian male bobsledders
Belgian male water polo players
Bobsledders at the 1952 Winter Olympics
Bobsledders at the 1956 Winter Olympics
Olympic bronze medalists for Belgium
Olympic water polo players of Belgium
Year of death missing
Water polo players at the 1936 Summer Olympics
Olympic medalists in water polo
Medalists at the 1936 Summer Olympics
Place of birth missing